NGC 3274 is a relatively faint spiral galaxy discovered by Wilhelm Herschel in 1783, and is located over 20 million light-years away in the constellation of Leo.

References

External links
 

Leo (constellation)
Intermediate spiral galaxies
3274
05721
031122